Carcans is a commune and town in the Gironde department, administrative region of Nouvelle-Aquitaine (before 2015: Aquitaine), France.

Carcans is one of the 14 members of the Community of Communes of Médoc Atlantique.

Geography

Location
Situated about 50 km of Bordeaux, Médoc, Carcans is a seaside resort between the Atlantic Ocean and the Hourtin-Carcans Lake.

Places
It includes 5 hubs : Carcans, the administrative centre (in the town's same name); Pouch, situated between forest and marsh; Maubuisson, the tour resort created 1960–1970; Bombannes, a sport area near the lake; Carcans-Plage, the seaside resort on the border of the ocean.

Population

See also
Communes of the Gironde department

References

External links

Official site
Official website of the tourist office Médoc Océan

Communes of Gironde